Said El Bouzidi (born 26 September 1967) is a Moroccan basketball coach who is the current head coach of Al Wehda Mecca.

He has known most of his successes while coaching AS Salé, winning three national league titles with the team as well as the FIBA Africa Club Champions Cup in 2017.

Career
In the 2018–19 season, El Bouzidi coached the Tunisian team US Monastir of the Championnat National A.

In October 2021, El Bouzidi took over Saudi club Al Wehda.

Awards and accomplishments
US Monastir
Championnat National A: (2019)
AS Salé
FIBA Africa Club Champions Cup: (2017)

4× Division Excellence: (2017, 2018, 2021, 2022)
2× Moroccan Throne Cup: (2017, 2018)

References

1967 births
Moroccan basketball coaches
AS Salé basketball coaches
US Monastir basketball coaches
Living people
Basketball Africa League coaches